The 1939 International Cross Country Championships was held in Cardiff, Wales, at the Ely Racecourse on 1 April 1939.  A report on the event was given in the Glasgow Herald.

Complete results, medallists, 
 and the results of British athletes were published.

Medallists

Individual Race Results

Men's (9 mi / 14.5 km)

Team Results

Men's

Participation
An unofficial count yields the participation of 63 athletes from 7 countries.

 (9)
 (9)
 (9)
 (9)
 (9)
 (9)
 (9)

See also
 1939 in athletics (track and field)

References

International Cross Country Championships
International Cross Country Championships
International Cross Country Championships
International athletics competitions hosted by Wales
Cross country running in the United Kingdom
Sports competitions in Cardiff
1930s in Cardiff
International Cross Country Championships